This is a list of titles published by J-Novel Club. J-Novel Club is a publishing company specializing in translation of Japanese light novels and novels into English.

Active translations

Titles in publication 
These are titles that are currently being published in Japan. Titles that have been translated through the current Japanese volume are indicated in bold. Titles that are waiting for the publication of the next volume in Japan are included in this list.

Titles that are completed 
These are titles that have completed publication in Japan. Once fully translated they will be moved to the Finished translations section.

Titles with no new volumes 
These titles have been translated through the latest Japanese volume, but have not had a new volume published in a 12-month period and do not have a volume announced by the publisher. There is no information that the title has been cancelled by the publisher or formally ended by the author.

Finished translations 
These titles have all of the Japanese volumes translated and no new volumes are expected to be published.

Suspended translation 
The translation of this title was suspended due to a controversy surrounding various racist tweets by the author.

References 

Light novels-related lists